McRae is an unincorporated community in Clay County, Florida, United States. It has an elementary school, McRae Elementary School.

References

Unincorporated communities in Clay County, Florida
Unincorporated communities in the Jacksonville metropolitan area
Unincorporated communities in Florida